Gordon Rahere Hoare (18 April 1884 – 27 October 1973) was an English amateur footballer who was a member of the Great Britain team that won the gold medal at the 1912 Summer Olympics. In club football, he played in the Football League for Woolwich Arsenal, Glossop and Fulham.

Club career
Born in Blackheath, Hoare started out with junior sides such as West Norwood, Woolwich Polytechnic, and Bromley before joining Woolwich Arsenal in 1907. He made his League debut in a First Division match against Sheffield Wednesday on 20 April 1908, the last day of the 1907–08 season. Although he played 11 League matches in 1908–09, scoring five goals, he was unhappy at the lack of regular first-team football and moved to Glossop in December 1909. From 1909 through to 1911 he also turned out occasionally for Kent League side Northfleet United.

He lasted a year at Glossop before returning to Woolwich Arsenal in December 1910. He scored seven times in 16 games for Arsenal in the 1910–11 season, but was once again dropped at the start of the following season, unable to oust Jackie Chalmers and Charles Randall from the front line. He rejoined Glossop in February 1912; in total, he played 34 times for Arsenal, scoring 13 goals.

After his second spell at Glossop, Hoare went on to play for Queens Park and Fulham, finally retiring in 1920. He died in 1973, aged 89.

International career

Hoare was capped multiple times for the England amateur team between 1909 and 1913, netting 11 goals, including 5 braces against Germany, France (2) and Denmark (2). He was a member of the team that represented Great Britain at the 1912 Summer Olympics: he played in all three matches and netted two goals, both of which in the final against Denmark as Great Britain won 4–2, thus contributing decisively to his side's triumph in Stockholm. He also scored a further 5 goals for the amateur team in unofficial matches, a brace against in a 5–1 win over Wales in 1911, a brace in a 2–3 loss to Ireland in 1912 and the winner (2–1) against a Bruges XI on 6 April 1912, bringing his tally to 16 goals.

International goals
England Amateurs score listed first, score column indicates score after each Hoare goal.

Personal life 
Hoare served as a lieutenant in the Army Service Corps during the First World War.

References

1884 births
1973 deaths
Footballers from Blackheath, London
English footballers
Association football forwards
England amateur international footballers
Olympic footballers of Great Britain
West Norwood F.C. players
Woolwich Polytechnic F.C. players
Bromley F.C. players
Arsenal F.C. players
Glossop North End A.F.C. players
Queen's Park F.C. players
Fulham F.C. players
English Football League players
Footballers at the 1912 Summer Olympics
Medalists at the 1912 Summer Olympics
English Olympic medallists
Olympic gold medallists for Great Britain
Olympic medalists in football
Royal Army Service Corps officers
British Army personnel of World War I